George Robert Biggs (born February 20, 1951) is a former American football player and coach. He played college football for UC Davis and was selected by the Associated Press as the first-team quarterback on the 1972 Little All-America college football team. He served as the head football coach at the University of California, Davis from 1993 to 2012, compiling a career record of 144–85–1. He was named the 2009 Great West Conference Coach of the Year.

Head coaching record

References

External links
 Just Sports Stats

1951 births
Living people
American football quarterbacks
Canadian football quarterbacks
UC Davis Aggies football coaches
UC Davis Aggies football players
Winnipeg Blue Bombers players
Portland Storm players
UC Davis Aggies men's tennis coaches
Players of Canadian football from San Diego
People from Vacaville, California
Players of American football from San Diego